The Hub Building in Burwell, Nebraska, also known as the Burwell's Modern Cash Department Store, was built in 1906.  It was listed on the National Register of Historic Places in 2006.

Its walls are built of rusticated concrete which appears to be stone. It has a tin Italianate-style cornice and has a parapet inscribed with "1906 / H.J. Coffin".

Space in the Hub Building was donated for temporary use by the community's library, supporting the community's efforts to obtain funding and construct the Burwell Carnegie Library, completed in 1914.

References

External links

Commercial buildings on the National Register of Historic Places in Nebraska
Italianate architecture in Nebraska
Buildings and structures completed in 1906
Buildings and structures in Garfield County, Nebraska
1906 establishments in Nebraska